Sleepyheads is a compilation album by Mr. Lif, released in 2003 on the Thought Wizard Productions label.  Many of the songs on the album had been previously released as vinyl-only singles; others had not been released at all prior to Sleepyheads.

Track listing
 "Madness In A Cup"
 "This Won"
 "Elektro"
 "The Nothing"
 "Triangular Warfare"
 "Inhuman Capabilities"
 "Farmhand"
 "Settle The Score"
 "Be Out"
 "Because They Made It That Way"
 "Day Of Power"
 "Night Train Radio Freestyle"
 "Target: Gristl"
 "Flick (Bonus)

References

2003 albums